The New York metropolitan area is home to the largest and most prominent ethnic Chinese population outside of Asia, hosting Chinese populations representing all 34 provincial-level administrative units of China. The Chinese American population of the New York City metropolitan area was an estimated 893,697 as of 2017, constituting the largest and most prominent metropolitan Asian national diaspora outside Asia. New York City itself contains by far the highest ethnic Chinese population of any individual city outside Asia, estimated at 628,763 as of 2017.

New York City and its surrounding metropolitan area, including Long Island and parts of New Jersey, is home to 12 Chinatowns, early U.S. racial ghettos where Chinese immigrants were made to live for economic survival and physical safety that are now known as important sites of tourism and urban economic activity. Six Chinatowns (or nine, New York including the emerging Chinatowns in Elmhurst and Whitestone, Queens, and East Harlem, Manhattan) are located in New York City proper, and one each is located in Nassau County, Long Island; Edison, New Jersey; West Windsor, New Jersey; and Parsippany-Troy Hills, New Jersey. This excludes fledgling ethnic Chinese enclaves emerging throughout the New York metropolitan area, such as Jersey City, New Jersey; China City of America in Sullivan County, New York; and Dragon Springs (in Deerpark, Orange County, New York), which serves as the de facto headquarters for both the global Falun Gong New religious movement as well as its Shen Yun performance arts troupe.

The Chinese American community in the New York metropolitan area is rising rapidly in population as well as economic and political influence. Continuing significant immigration from Mainland China has spurred the ongoing rise of the Chinese population in the New York metropolitan area; this immigration and its accompanying growth in the impact of the Chinese presence continue to be fueled by New York's status as an alpha global city, its high population density, its extensive mass transit system, and the New York metropolitan area's enormous economic marketplace.

History

Among the earliest documented arrivals of Chinese immigrants in New York City were of "sailors and peddlers" in the 1830s. These arrivals were followed in 1847 by three students who came to continue their education in the United States. One of these scholars, Yung Wing, soon became the first Chinese American to graduate from a U.S. college in 1854, when Wing graduated from Yale University.

Many more Chinese immigrants arrived and settled in Lower Manhattan throughout the 1800s, including an 1870s wave of Chinese immigrants searching for "gold." By 1880, the enclave around Five Points was estimated to have from 200 to as many as 1,100 members. However, the Chinese Exclusion Act, which went into effect in 1882, caused an abrupt decline in the number of Chinese who emigrated to New York and the rest of the United States. Later, in 1943, the Chinese were given a small quota, the Immigration and Nationality Act of 1965 caused a revival in Chinese immigration, and the community's population gradually increased until 1968, when the quota was lifted and the Chinese American population skyrocketed. 

In 1992, New York City officially began providing language assistance for electoral materials in Chinese, given that this population had reached a critical mass in numbers. The Sino-American Friendship Association was established in Midtown Manhattan in 1992. In 2022, "police stations" serving as espionage arms of the Chinese Communist Party were discovered and shut down in Chinatown, Manhattan and Chinatown, Flushing.

Demographics

New York City boroughs

New York City has the largest Chinese population of any city outside of Asia and within the U.S. with an estimated population of 573,388 in 2014, and continues to be a primary destination for new Chinese immigrants. New York City is subdivided into official municipal boroughs, which themselves are home to significant Chinese populations, with Brooklyn and Queens, adjacently located on Long Island, leading the fastest growth. After the City of New York itself, the boroughs of Queens and Brooklyn encompass the largest Chinese populations, respectively, of all municipalities in the United States.

Large-scale immigration continues from China

In 2013, 19,645 Chinese legally immigrated to the New York-Northern New Jersey-Long Island, NY-NJ-PA core based statistical area from Mainland China, greater than the combined totals for Los Angeles and San Francisco, the next two largest Chinese American gateways; in 2012, this number was 24,763; 28,390 in 2011; and 19,811 in 2010. These numbers do not include the remainder of the New York-Newark-Bridgeport, NY-NJ-CT-PA Combined Statistical Area, nor do they include the significantly smaller numbers of legal immigrants from Taiwan and Hong Kong. There has additionally been a consequential component of Chinese emigration of illegal origin, most notably Fuzhou people from Fujian and Wenzhounese from Zhejiang in mainland China, specifically destined for New York City, beginning in the 1980s.

Quantification of the magnitude of this modality of emigration is imprecise and varies over time, but it appears to continue unabated on a significant basis. As of April 2019, China Airlines (flying non-stop to Taipei), China Eastern Airlines, China Southern Airlines, EVA Air, Hainan Airlines, and XiamenAir all served John F. Kennedy International Airport (JFK), while Air China and Cathay Pacific Airways served both JFK and Newark Liberty International Airport in the New York metropolitan areaand among U.S. carriers, United Airlines flew non-stop from Newark to Beijing, Shanghai, and Hong Kong. Hainan Airlines flies non-stop from JFK to both Chengdu and Chongqing in Western China; while China Southern Airlines is expected to start non-stop flights from JFK to Wuhan, in Central China, in July 2019. Meanwhile, Singapore Airlines flies to Singapore, where Standard Chinese is one of the official state languages, both from Newark (with one of the longest non-stop flights in the world) and from JFK.

Within the Chinese population, New York City is also home to between 150,000 and 200,000 Fuzhounese Americans, who have exerted a large influence upon the Chinese restaurant industry across the United States; the vast majority of the growing population of Fuzhounese Americans have settled in New York.

The Chinese immigrant population in New York City grew from 261,500 foreign-born individuals in 2000 to 350,000 in 2011, representing a more than 33% growth of that demographic. Chinese immigrants represented 12,000 of the country's asylum requests in fiscal year 2013, of which 4,000 applied for asylum to the New York-area asylum office.

Movement within and outside the metropolitan area
As many immigrant Chinese to New York City move up the socioeconomic ladder, many have relocated to the suburbs for more living space as well as seeking particular school districts for their children. In this process, new Chinese enclaves and Chinatown commercial districts have emerged and are growing in these suburbs, particularly in Nassau County on Long Island and in the four counties of New Jersey that start with the letter "M": Mercer County, Middlesex County, Monmouth County, and Morris County. Some Chinese New Yorkers are also migrating to Boston, Philadelphia, and eastern Connecticut.

Geography

The Manhattan Chinatown was the original Chinatown. Little Fuzhou in Manhattan is an ethnoculturally distinct neighborhood within the Manhattan Chinatown itself, populated primarily by Fujianese people. The Sunset Park neighborhood of Brooklyn houses another such Little Fuzhou. Queens and Brooklyn are home to other Chinatowns. The Flushing as well as Elmhurst areas of Queens and multiple burgeoning neighborhoods in Brooklyn also have spawned the development of numerous other Chinatowns. Most of Manhattan, as well as Corona in Queens, the Brooklyn Heights and Park Slope areas of Brooklyn, and northeast Staten Island, have also received significant Chinese settlement.

Chinatowns

Manhattan (曼哈頓華埠)

Manhattan's Chinatown holds the highest concentration of Chinese people in the Western Hemisphere. Manhattan's Chinatown is also one of the oldest Chinese ethnic enclaves. The Manhattan Chinatown is one of nine Chinatown neighborhoods in New York City, as well as one of twelve in the New York metropolitan area, which contains the largest ethnic Chinese population outside of Asia, comprising an estimated 893,697 uniracial individuals as of 2017.
Manhattan's Chinatown is actually divided into two different portions. The western portion is the older and original part of Manhattan's Chinatown, primarily dominated by Cantonese populations and known colloquially as the Cantonese Chinatown. Cantonese were the earlier settlers of Manhattan's Chinatown, originating mostly from Hong Kong and from Taishan in Guangdong Province, as well as from Shanghai. They form most of the Chinese population of the area surrounded by Mott and Canal Streets.

However, within Manhattan's Chinatown lies Little Fuzhou or The Fuzhou Chinatown on East Broadway and surrounding streets, occupied predominantly by immigrants from the province of Fujian, Mainland China. They are the later settlers, from Fuzhou, Fujian, forming the majority of the Chinese population in the vicinity of East Broadway. This eastern portion of Manhattan's Chinatown developed much later, primarily after the Fuzhou immigrants began moving in.

Areas surrounding "Little Fuzhou" consist of significant numbers of Cantonese immigrants from the Guangdong of China; however, the main concentration of people speaking the Cantonese language is in the older western portion of Manhattan's Chinatown. Despite the fact that the Mandarin speaking communities were becoming established in Flushing and Elmhurst areas of Queens during the 1980s–1990s and even though the Fuzhou immigrants spoke Mandarin often as well, however, due to their socioeconomic status, they could not afford the housing prices in Mandarin speaking enclaves in Queens, which were more middle class and the job opportunities were limited. They instead chose to settle in Manhattan's Chinatown for affordable housing and as well as the job opportunities that were available such as the seamstress factories and restaurants, despite the traditional Cantonese dominance until the 1990s. Eventually this pattern was repeated in Brooklyn's Sunset Park Chinatown, but on a much more immense scale.

However, the Cantonese dialect that has dominated Chinatown for decades is being rapidly swept aside by Mandarin, the national language of China and the lingua franca due to the influx of Fuzhou immigrants who often speak Mandarin and as well as there are now more Mandarin speaking visitors coming to visit the neighborhood. Chinatown's modern borders are roughly Delancey Street on the north, Chambers Street on the south, East Broadway on the east, and Broadway on the west.

Queens (皇后華埠)

New York City's satellite Chinatowns in Queens, as well as in Brooklyn, are thriving as traditionally urban enclaves, as large-scale Chinese immigration into New York continues, with the largest metropolitan Chinese population outside Asia. busy intersection of Main Street, Kissena Boulevard, and 41st Avenue in the Flushing Chinatown (法拉盛華埠), in Queens. The segment of Main Street between Kissena Boulevard and Roosevelt Avenue, punctuated by the Long Island Rail Road trestle overpass, represents the cultural heart of Flushing Chinatown. Housing more than 30,000 individuals born in China alone, the largest by this metric outside Asia, Flushing is home to one of the largest and fastest-growing Chinatowns in the world. Massage parlors in the Flushing Chinatown have become the hub of organized prostitution in the United States.

The Flushing Chinatown, in the Flushing area of the borough of Queens in New York City, is one of the largest and fastest growing ethnic Chinese enclaves outside Asia, as well as within New York City itself. Main Street and the area to its west, particularly along Roosevelt Avenue, have become the primary nexus of Flushing Chinatown. However, Flushing Chinatown continues to expand southeastward along Kissena Boulevard and northward beyond Northern Boulevard. In the 1970s, a Chinese community established a foothold in the neighborhood of Flushing, whose demographic constituency had been predominantly non-Hispanic white. Taiwanese began the surge of immigration. It originally started off as Little Taipei or Little Taiwan due to the large Taiwanese population. Due to the then dominance of working class Cantonese immigrants of Manhattan's Chinatown including its poor housing conditions, they could not relate to them and settled in Flushing.

Later on, when other groups of Non-Cantonese Chinese, mostly speaking Mandarin started arriving into NYC, like the Taiwanese, they could not relate to Manhattan's then dominant Cantonese Chinatown, as a result they mainly settled with Taiwanese to be around Mandarin speakers. Later, Flushing's Chinatown would become the main center of different Chinese regional groups and cultures in NYC. By 1990, Asians constituted 41% of the population of the core area of Flushing, with Chinese in turn representing 41% of the Asian population. However, ethnic Chinese are constituting an increasingly dominant proportion of the Asian population as well as of the overall population in Flushing and its Chinatown. A 1986 estimate by the Flushing Chinese Business Association approximated 60,000 Chinese in Flushing alone. Mandarin Chinese (including Northeastern Mandarin), Fuzhou dialect, Min Nan Fujianese, Wu Chinese, Beijing dialect, Wenzhounese, Shanghainese, Suzhou dialect, Hangzhou dialect, Changzhou dialect, Cantonese, Hokkien, and English are all prevalently spoken in Flushing Chinatown, while the Mongolian language is now emerging. Even the relatively obscure Dongbei style of cuisine indigenous to Northeast China is now available there. Given its rapidly growing status, the Flushing Chinatown has surpassed the original New York City Chinatown in the Borough of Manhattan in size and population, while Queens and Brooklyn vie for the largest Chinese population of any municipality in the United States other than New York City as a whole.

Elmhurst, another neighborhood in Queens, also has a large and growing Chinese community. Previously a small area with Chinese shops on Broadway between 81st Street and Cornish Avenue, this new Chinatown has now expanded to 45th Avenue and Whitney Avenue. Since 2000, thousands of Chinese Americans have migrated into Whitestone, Queens (白石), given the sizeable presence of the neighboring Flushing Chinatown, and have continued their expansion eastward in Queens and into neighboring, highly educated Nassau County (拿騷縣) on Long Island (長島), which has become the most popular suburban destination in the U.S. for Chinese.

Brooklyn (布魯克林華埠)

By 1988, 90% of the storefronts on Eighth Avenue in Sunset Park, Brooklyn, were abandoned. Chinese immigrants then moved into this area, consisting of not only new arrivals from China, but also members of Manhattan's Chinatown seeking refuge from high rents, who flocked to the relatively less expensive property costs and rents of Sunset Park and formed the original Brooklyn Chinatown, which now extends for 20 blocks along 8th Avenue, from 42nd to 62nd Streets. This relatively new but rapidly growing Chinatown located in Sunset Park was originally settled by Cantonese immigrants like Manhattan's Chinatown in the past. However, in the recent decade, an influx of Fuzhou immigrants has been pouring into Brooklyn's Chinatown and supplanting the Cantonese at a significantly higher rate than in Manhattan's Chinatown, and Brooklyn's Chinatown is now home to mostly Fuzhou immigrants.

In the past, during the 1980s and 1990s, the majority of newly arriving Fuzhou immigrants settled within Manhattan's Chinatown, and the first Little Fuzhou community emerged within Manhattan's Chinatown; by the first decade of the 21st century, however, the epicenter of the massive Fuzhou influx had shifted to Brooklyn's Chinatown, which is now home to the fastest-growing and perhaps largest Fuzhou population in New York City. Unlike the Little Fuzhou in Manhattan's Chinatown, which remains surrounded by areas which continue to house significant populations of Cantonese, all of Brooklyn's Chinatown is swiftly consolidating into New York City's new Little Fuzhou. However, a growing community of Wenzhounese immigrants from China's Zhejiang is now also arriving in Brooklyn's Chinatown. Also in contrast to Manhattan's Chinatown, which still successfully continues to carry a large Cantonese population and retain the large Cantonese community established decades ago in its western section, where Cantonese residents have a communal venue to shop, work, and socialize, Brooklyn's Chinatown has seen a change from its primarily Cantonese community identity to a more diverse Chinese melange.

Like Manhattan's Chinatown during the 1980s and 1990s (pre-gentrification), Brooklyn's Chinatown became the main affordable housing center for Fuzhou immigrantsand for job opportunities ranging from seamstress factories and restaurantsdespite its domination by Cantonese immigrants in the earlier years.

Bensonhurst, Brooklyn, as well as Avenue U in Homecrest, Brooklyn, in addition to Bay Ridge, Borough Park, Coney Island, Dyker Heights, Gravesend, and Marine Park, have given rise to the development of Brooklyn's newer satellite Chinatowns, as evidenced by the growing number of Chinese-run fruit markets, restaurants, beauty and nail salons, small offices, and computer and consumer electronics dealers. While the foreign-born Chinese population in New York City jumped 35 percent between 2000 and 2013, to 353,000 from about 262,000, the foreign-born Chinese population in Brooklyn increased 49 percent during the same period, to 128,000 from 86,000, according to The New York Times. The emergence of multiple Chinatowns in Brooklyn is due to the overcrowding and high property values in Brooklyn's main Chinatown in Sunset Park, and many Cantonese immigrants have moved out of Sunset Park into these new areas. As a result, the newer emerging, but smaller Brooklyn's Chinatowns are primarily Cantonese dominated while the main Brooklyn Chinatown is increasingly dominated by Fuzhou emigres.

List
Chinatowns of NYC:
Chinatown, Manhattan (紐約華埠)
Little Hong Kong/Guangdong (小香港/廣東)
Little Fuzhou (小福州)
East Harlem (東哈萊姆)
Chinatowns in Queens (皇后):
Chinatown, Flushing (法拉盛華埠)
Chinatown, Elmhurst (唐人街, 艾姆赫斯特)
Corona, Queens
Whitestone, Queens (白石)
Chinatowns in Brooklyn (布魯克林):
Chinatown, Sunset Park (布鲁克林華埠)
Chinatown, Avenue U (唐人街, U大道)
Chinatown, Bensonhurst (唐人街, 本森社区)

Culture

Languages
For much of the overall history of the Chinese community in New York City, Taishanese was the dominant Chinese dialect. After 1965, an influx of immigrants from Hong Kong made Cantonese the dominant dialect for the next three decades.

Later on, during the 1970s–80s, Mandarin and Fuzhou-speaking immigrants began to arrive into New York City. Taiwanese were settling into Flushing, Queens when it was still predominantly European American, while Fuzhou immigrants were settling in Manhattan's then very Cantonese-dominated Chinatown. The Taiwanese and Fuzhou people were the earliest significant numbers of Chinese immigrants to arrive into New York who spoke Mandarin but not Cantonese, although many spoke their regional Chinese dialects as well.

Since the mid 1990s, an influx of immigrants from various parts of Mainland China began arriving later on eventually, with the increased influence of Mandarin in the Chinese-speaking world, and a desire of Chinese parents to have their children learn this language, Mandarin has been in the process of becoming the dominant lingua franca among the Chinese population of New York City. In the Manhattan Chinatown, many newer immigrants who speak Mandarin live around East Broadway, while Chinatowns in Brooklyn and Queens have also witnessed influxes of Mandarin-speaking Chinese as well as Min Chinese and Southern Min speakers.

Unique Demographics of NYC Chinese Enclaves
However, the different Chinese cultural and language groups as well as socioeconomic statuses are often subdivided among different boroughs of New York City. In Queens, the Chinatowns are very diverse, composed of different Chinese regional groups mainly speaking Mandarin although speaking other dialects as well, and who are more often middle- or upper-middle class. As a result, the Mandarin dialect is primarily concentrated in Queens. In addition, Flushing's Chinatown is now the largest Chinese cultural center of New York City, including being the most diverse with many different Chinese populations from many various regions of China and Taiwan, but in since the 2000s, especially since the 2010s, the Northeastern Chinese immigrants have been increasingly becoming a more dominant Chinese population in Flushing Queens.

However, since Manhattan's Chinatown and Brooklyn's Chinese enclaves still hold large Cantonese speaking populations, who were the earlier Chinese immigrants to arrive into New York City and with the popularity of Hong Kong Cantonese cuisine and entertainment being widely available, the Cantonese dialect and culture still hold a large influence, and Cantonese is still a dialect in those enclaves.

Even though there are very large Fuzhou populations in Manhattan's Chinatown and Brooklyn's Chinese enclaves, many of whom speak Mandarin as well, the influence of Mandarin in those enclaves is as only one of the dialects in addition to Cantonese, rather than being the dominant oneunlike in the Chinese enclaves in Queens, where Mandarin is the most dominant dialect and as well as an almost exclusive dialect, despite the presence of a high diversity of Chinese regional languages in Queenssince there are fewer Mandarin speakers besides the Fuzhou population in Manhattan and Brooklyn than in Queens.

However, in Brooklyn, Fuzhou speakers predominate in the large Chinatown in Sunset Park while the several smaller emerging Chinatowns in various sections of Bensonhurst and in a section of Sheepshead Bay are primarily Cantonese speakers, unlike in Manhattan's Chinatown, where the Cantonese enclave and Fuzhou enclave are directly adjacent to each other. Therefore, Mandarin and Cantonese dialects significantly varies between the different Chinatowns of Sunset Park, Bensonhurst and Sheepshead Bay. Cantonese is the main variety of Chinese spoken in Bensonhurst's and Sheepshead Bay's Chinatowns, since they are mostly Cantonese populated; Mandarin is another, but less dominant variety. Since Sunset Park's Chinatown is now mostly Fuzhou populated, Mandarin is more dominant there. In Manhattan's Chinatown, Cantonese is dominant in the western portion and Fuzhouese in the eastern portion. Cantonese and Mandarin are equally spoken there due to the high number of Mainland Chinese visitors and Cantonese residents from other neighborhoods.

The Cantonese and Fuzhou populations are often more working class. However, because of the gentrification in Manhattan's Chinatown, Sunset Park in Brooklyn is increasingly becoming the main target for newly arrived Fuzhou immigrants while Bensonhurst and Sheepshead Bay in Brooklyn are increasingly becoming the main targets for the newly arrived Cantonese immigrants. This shift has now resulted in Brooklyn's Chinatowns rapidly replacing Manhattan's Chinatown as the largest primary gathering cultural centers for the Cantonese and Fuzhou populations of New York City.

Cuisine
Given that the New York City metropolitan area has become home to the largest overseas Chinese population outside of Asia, all popular styles of regional Chinese cuisine have commensurately become ubiquitously accessible in New York City, including Hakka, Taiwanese, Shanghainese, Hunanese, Sichuanese, Cantonese, Fujianese, Xinjiang, Zhejiang, Korean-Chinese, and Malaysian Chinese cuisine. Even the relatively obscure Dongbei style of cuisine indigenous to Northeast China is now available in Flushing, Queens, as well as Mongolian cuisine and Uyghur cuisine. The availability of the regional variations of Chinese cuisine originating from throughout the different Provinces of China is most apparent in the city's Chinatowns in Queens, particularly the Flushing Chinatown (法拉盛華埠), but is also notable in the city's Chinatowns in Brooklyn and Manhattan.

Kosher preparation of Chinese food

Kosher preparation of Chinese food is also widely available in New York City, given the metropolitan area's large Jewish and particularly Orthodox Jewish populations. The perception that American Jews eat at Chinese restaurants on Christmas Day is documented in media as a common stereotype with a basis in fact. The tradition may have arisen from the lack of other open restaurants on Christmas Day, as well as the close proximity of Jewish and Chinese immigrants to each other in New York City. Kosher Chinese food is usually prepared in New York City, as well as in other large cities with Orthodox Jewish neighborhoods, under strict rabbinical supervision as a prerequisite for Kosher certification.

News media

Numerous media publications geared toward serving the Chinese diaspora are headquartered you in the New York metropolitan area. The World Journal, one of the largest Chinese-language newspapers outside of Asia, has its headquarters in Whitestone (白石), Queens.

The China Press is headquartered in Midtown Manhattan. The Epoch Times, an international multi-language newspaper and media company affiliated with the Falun Gong new religious movement, is also headquartered in Manhattan. The Hong Kong-based, multinational Chinese-language newspaper Sing Tao Daily maintains its overseas headquarters in Chinatown, Manhattan. The Beijing-based, English-language newspaper China Daily publishes a U.S. edition, which is based in the 1500 Broadway skyscraper in Times Square. In addition, the Global Chinese Times is published in Edison, Middlesex County, New Jersey, to serve both a growing global readership and New Jersey's growing Chinese population of over 150,000 in 2016.

Museums
The Museum of Chinese in America is located in the Manhattan Chinatown, at 215 Centre Street, and this prominent cultural institution has documented the Chinese American experience since 1980.

Chinese Lunar New Year

Chinese Lunar New Year is celebrated annually throughout New York City's Chinatowns. Chinese New Year was signed into law as an allowable school holiday in the State of New York by Governor Andrew Cuomo in December 2014, as absentee rates had run as high as 60% in some New York City schools on this day. In June 2015, New York City Mayor Bill de Blasio declared that the Lunar New Year would be made a public school holiday.

Religion
Beginning in 2006 many Chinese Catholics began worshipping at St. John Vianney Church in Flushing.

Education
P.S.184 is a public school in Manhattan's Chinatown, as part of the New York City Department of Education, that offers a dual-language instructional program in Mandarin and English. Conversely, the Yung Wing school, also in Manhattan's Chinatown and known additionally as P.S.124, is an elementary school within the New York City Department of Education. The Huaxia Edison Chinese School operates in Edison, Middlesex County, New Jersey, as a branch of the Huaxia Chinese School system; while all students at the YingHua International School in nearby Kingston, New Jersey are fluent in Mandarin by 8th grade. Chinese Americans compose a disproportionate enrollment relative to the general population in the nine elite public high schools of New York City, including Stuyvesant High School and Bronx Science High School.

Transportation
Numerous New York City Subway routes directly serve the multiple Chinatowns of New York City. The BMT Fourth Avenue Line and BMT Brighton Line connect Chinese communities in Lower Manhattan and Brooklyn. The Little Fuzhou neighborhood within Chinatown, Manhattan, hosts the East Broadway station on the IND Sixth Avenue Line. The IRT Lexington Avenue Line serves the burgeoning Chinese community of East Harlem in Upper Manhattan. Meanwhile, Flushing in Queens is served by the IRT Flushing Line of the New York City Subway, as well as by four stations of the Long Island Rail Road (LIRR)'s Port Washington Branch.

A system of dollar vans operates between the different Chinatowns in New York City. The dollar vans (which are distinct from, and not to be confused with, Chinatown bus lines), go from Manhattan's Chinatown to places in Sunset Park, Brooklyn; Elmhurst, Queens; and Flushing, Queens. There is also a service from Flushing to Sunset Park that does not pass through Manhattan. Contrary to their name, the dollar vans' fares are $2.50, which is cheaper than the New York City transit fares of $2.75 .

There are also intercity bus services that operate from the Chinatowns in New York City.

, the two largest Taiwanese airlines have provided free shuttle services to and from John F. Kennedy International Airport in New York City for customers based in New Jersey.
 China Airlines's service stops in Fort Lee, Parsippany, and Jersey City
 EVA Air's service stops in Jersey City, Piscataway, Fort Lee, and East Hanover.

Organizations

Area Chinese-American associations include the Millburn-Short Hills Chinese Association (MSHCA) in New Jersey, which hosts a moon festival each year. 2005 is the year of the organization's establishments.

The Long Island Chinese American Association (LICAA) serves those on Long Island. , Gordon Zhang is the president. Other associations include Chinese American Association of North Hempstead and the Herricks Chinese Association.

Political influence

The political stature of Chinese Americans in New York City has become prominent. As of 2017, Guo Wengui, a self claimed Chinese billionaire turned political activist, has been in self-imposed exile in New York City, where he owns an apartment worth $68million on the Upper East Side of Manhattan, overlooking Central Park. He has continued to conduct a political agenda to bring attention to alleged corruption in the Chinese political system from his New York home. Taiwan-born John Liu, former New York City Council member representing District 20, which includes Flushing Chinatown and other northern Queens neighborhoods, was elected New York City Comptroller in November 2009, becoming the first Asian American to be elected to a citywide office in New York City. Concomitantly, Peter Koo, born in Shanghai, was elected to succeed Liu to assume this council membership seat. Margaret Chin became the first Chinese American woman representing Manhattan's Chinatown on the New York City Council, elected in 2009. Grace Meng is a member of the United States House of Representatives, representing New York's 6th congressional district in Queens since 2009. Of the more than 2,100 Asian Americans within the uniformed ranks of the New York Police Department (NYPD) in 2015about six percent of the totalroughly half were Chinese American, NYPD statistics show, a number which has grown tenfold since 1990. Yuh-Line Niou is a Taiwanese-American Democratic Party member of the New York State Assembly representing the 65th district in Lower Manhattan, elected in 2016, taking over the seat previously held by Sheldon Silver.

In 2021 Republican Party politicians, including Curtis Sliwa, who ran for Mayor of New York City, attracted Chinese American voters who opposed Democratic Party policies in education and crime.

Economic influence

The economic influence of Chinese in New York City is growing as well. The majority of cash purchases of New York City real estate in the first half of 2015 were transacted by Chinese as a combination of overseas Chinese and Chinese Americans. The top three surnames of cash purchasers of Manhattan real estate during that time period were Chen, Liu, and Wong. Chinese have also invested billions of dollars into New York commercial real estate since 2013. According to China Daily, the ferris wheel under construction on Staten Island, slated to be among the world's tallest and most expensive with an estimated cost of $500million, has received $170million in funding from approximately 300 Chinese investors through the U.S. EB-5 immigrant investor program, which grants permanent residency to foreign investors in exchange for job-creating investments in the United States, with Chinese immigrating to New York City dominating this list. Chinese billionaires have been buying New York property to be used as pied-à-terres, often priced in the tens of millions of U.S. dollars each, and as of 2016, middle-class Chinese investors were purchasing real estate in New York. Chinese companies have also been raising billions of dollars on stock exchanges in New York via initial public offerings. The major Chinese banks maintain operational offices in New York City.

Notable people

Academia and humanities
 Anthony Chan – chief economist, JPMorgan Chase; former economist at the Federal Reserve Bank of New York and economics professor at the University of Dayton
 Sewin Chan – Director of the PhD program, NYU Wagner School of Public Service
 Peter Kwong – professor of Asian American studies at Hunter College and professor of sociology in the City University of New York system
 Betty Lee Sung – leading literary authority on Chinese Americans and former professor at City College of New York
 Tim Wu – professor at Columbia Law School
 Yiju Huang – assistant professor of Chinese and comparative literature at Fordham University

Academia and sciences
 Chien-Shiung Wu – late experimental physicist and Columbia University professor
 David Ho – scientific researcher and Helen Wu professor at Columbia University
 Tsung-Dao Lee – university professor emeritus at Columbia University, Nobel Prize winner in physics
 Z.Y. Fu – founder of the Fu Foundation School of Engineering at Columbia University

Business
 Sam Chang – real estate and hotel developer
 James S.C. Chao – shipping magnate and father of former U.S. Cabinet member Elaine Chao
 Guo Wengui – billionaire businessman and political activist
 Andrea Jung – CEO and president of Grameen America, a non-profit microfinance company with philanthropy as its primary mission
 Kim Y. Lew – CEO, Columbia Investment Management Co., manager of the multi-billion dollar Columbia University endowment
 Charles Wang – late owner, New York Islanders team of the National Hockey League

Entrepreneurship and technology
 Perry Chen – co-founder of Kickstarter
 Christopher Cheung – co-founder, Boxed
 Chieh Huang – CEO and co-founder, Boxed
 William Fong – co-founder, Boxed
 Andrew Yang – founder, Venture for America; U.S. 2020 Democratic presidential candidate; candidate, New York City mayoral election 2021; and pioneer of the Universal Basic Income concept
 David Zhu – co-founder, Enterproid

Law, politics, and diplomacy
 Margaret Chan – New York State Supreme Court Civil Branch justice in Manhattan
 Leigh Cheng – New York City Court judge, Brooklyn
 Denny Chin – justice on the United States Court of Appeals for the Second Circuit in Manhattan
 Margaret Chin – first Chinese American woman elected to represent Manhattan's Chinatown on the New York City Council in 2009
 Edith Hsu-Chen – Executive director, New York City Department of City Planning, appointed by Mayor Eric Adams in 2022
 Peter Koo – New York City councilman elected in 2009 to represent District 20 in Queens 
 Li Baodong – President of the United Nations Security Council during months in 2011 and 2012
 Doris Ling-Cohan – New York State Supreme Court Civil Branch justice in Manhattan
 Liu Jieyi – Permanent Representative of China to the United Nations from 2013 to 2017
 John Liu – first Taiwanese American, Chinese American, and Asian American to be elected New York City Comptroller, in 2009
 Ma Zhaoxu – current Permanent Representative of China to the United Nations, since January 2018
 Grace Meng – member of the United States House of Representatives, representing New York's 6th congressional district in Queens
 Sarah Min – activist
 Yuh-Line Niou – member of the New York State Assembly, representing the 65th District in Lower Manhattan, elected in November 2016
 Chi Ossé – youngest ever member of the New York City Council to be elected, in January 2022 at age 23, to represent District 36 in Brooklyn
 Fred Teng – president and founder of the America China Public Affairs Institute in 2012
 Qian Julie Wang – writer, civil rights lawyer 
 Wenjian Liu – first Chinese American officer in the New York City Police Department to die in the line of duty in 2014
 Wenliang Wang – honorary chairman, NYU Center on U.S.-China relations
 Ya-Ting Liu – first chief public realm officer of New York City
 Peter Yew – Chinese Americans first protested police brutality with high-profile activism outside New York City Hall in May 1975, after the beating of this 27-year-old Chinese-American engineer who was a bystander at the scene of a traffic dispute in Chinatown in Manhattan.
 Zhang Yesui – Permanent Representative of China to the United Nations from 2008 to 2010

Media

 Ai Heping – journalist, China Daily
 An Rong Xu – photographer, journalist
 Kathy YL Chan – journalist, Bloomberg News
 Wilfred Chan – The Guardian
 Clio Chang – journalist, Curbed
 Gordon G. Chang – journalist, multiple platforms
 Laura Chang – journalist, editor of the Booming blog, The New York Times
 Lia Chang – actress and photographic journalist, multiple media platforms
 Adrian Chen – investigative journalist, staff writer at The New Yorker 
 Aria Hangyu Chen – multimedia journalist
 Brian X. Chen – lead consumer technology journalist, The New York Times
 Caroline Chen – journalist, ProPublica
 David W. Chen – investigative journalist, City Hall bureau chief, The New York Times
 Elaine Chen – digital editor, The New York Times
 Stefanos Chen – real estate reporter, The New York Times
 Evelyn Cheng – journalist, CNBC
 Roger Cheng – executive editor in charge of breaking news, CNET News
 Paul Cheung – journalist, global director of interactive and digital news production, The Associated Press
 Ronny Chieng – comedian
 Andrew R. Chow – journalist, The New York Times
 Denise Chow – science and technology editor, NBC News
 Dominic Chu – journalist, CNBC
 Christine Chung – journalist, The New York Times
 Connie Chung – journalist
 James Dao – op-ed editor, The New York Times
 Wendi Deng – media personality, film producer, and businessperson
 Christina Fan – journalist, WCBS-TV
 Scarlet Fu – Bloomberg Television anchor and New York Stock Exchange reporter
 Esther Fung – journalist, The Wall Street Journal
 Lisa Kailai Han – journalist, Business Insider 
 Amy He – journalist, China Daily
 Angela He – corporate communications specialist, The New York Times
 Gary He – journalist, Vox Media
 Krystal Hu – journalist, Reuters
 Hezi Jiang – journalist, China Daily
 Nicole Hong – law enforcement and courts journalist, The New York Times
 Hong Xiao – journalist, China Daily
 Cindy Hsu – journalist, WCBS-TV
 Tiffany Hsu – business reporter, The New York Times
 Winnie Hu – journalist, The New York Times
 Hua Hsu – journalist, The New Yorker
 Eddie Huang – writer, author of Fresh Off the Boat: A Memoir
 Virginia Huie – journalist, News 12 Long Island
 Jing Cao – journalist, Bloomberg News
 Jason Kao – journalist, The New York Times
 K.K. Rebecca Lai – graphics editor, The New York Times
 Chau Lam – Gothamist
 Katherine Lam – digital producer, Fox News
 Jennifer 8. Lee – journalist, credits including The New York Times
 Melissa Lee – news anchor, Fast Money on CNBC
 Kristin Lin – op-ed columnist, The New York Times
 Betty Liu – news anchor, Bloomberg Television
 Jennifer Liu – journalist, CNBC
 Denise Lu – The New York Times
 Lu Wang – journalist, Bloomberg News
 Richard Lui – news anchor, MSNBC and NBC News
 Michael Luo – journalist, The New York Times
 Sarah Min – investing reporter, CNBC
 Alfred Ng – associate engagement editor, New York Daily News
 Niu Yue – journalist, China Daily
 Rong Xiaoqing – journalist, Curbed
 Shiyu (Shelly) Xu – field producer, Fox News 
 Gillian Tan – Bloomberg Gadfly columnist covering private equity and mergers and acquisitions
 Terry Tang – deputy editorial page editor, The New York Times
 Kaity Tong – journalist, news anchor
 Crystal Tse – Bloomberg News
 Echo Wang – journalist, Reuters
 Christine Wang – news editor, CNBC
 Vivian Wang – journalist, The New York Times
 Justin Wee – photojournalist, The New York Times
 Andrea Wong – journalist, Bloomberg News
 Natalie Wong – journalist, Bloomberg News
 Vanessa Wong – journalist, BuzzFeed
 Jeff Yang – media consultant, "Tao Jones" columnist for The Wall Street Journal
 Kimberly Yam – journalist, HuffPost
 Lucy Yang (disambiguate) – journalist, WABC-TV
 Lucy Yang (disambiguate) – Zola
 Maya Yang – journalist, The Guardian
 Stephen Yang – photojournalist, New York Post
 Yueqi Yang – journalist, Bloomberg News
 Angela Yee – radio personality
 Vivian Yee – journalist, The New York Times
 Claudia Yeung – communications director, Hong Kong Economic and Trade Office, New York
 William Yu – digital media strategist
 Jada Yuan – travel correspondent, The New York Times
 Yun Li – journalist, CNBC
 Benjamin P. Zhang – journalist, Business Insider
 Raymond Zhong – climate change journalist, part of the 2021 Pulitzer Prize winning team for COVID-19 pandemic coverage, The New York Times
 Zijia Song – journalist, multiple media platforms

Theater, arts, and culture

 Celia Au – actress and filmmaker
 Awkwafina (Nora Lum) – Korean-Chinese actress and rapper
 Malan Breton – fashion designer
 Kevin Chan – fashion designer
 Amy Chang – actress
 Fala Chen – actress
 Angel Chang – fashion designer
 Cheung Pei Pei – actress
 Margaret Cho – Korean-Chinese multi-hyphenate entertainer and LGBT social activist
 David Chu – fashion designer
 Grace Zia Chu – late author of Chinese cookbooks
 Diana Eng – fashion designer
 Ying Fang – principal soprano at the Metropolitan Opera
 Fei Fei Sun – supermodel
 Vivienne Hu – fashion designer
 David Henry Hwang – Broadway playwright, librettist, and screenwriter
 MC Jin – rapper
 Yue-Sai Kan – television host and producer, entrepreneur, fashion icon, author and humanitarian
 Jonathan Koon – fashion designer 
 Derek Lam – fashion designer
 Ming Cho Lee – set designer
 Li Hongzhi – founder of Falun Gong
 Humberto Leon – fashion designer
 Tina Leung – actress, Bling Empire: New York
 Li Yu – actress
 Phillip Lim – fashion designer
 Jenny Lin – pianist
 Joseph Lin – violinist
 Ling Tan – supermodel
 Lucy Liu – actress, fashion model, and artist
 Liu Wen – supermodel
 Chella Man – artist, actor, and transgender model
 Angela Mao – former actress and martial artist, aka "Lady Kung Fu"
 Peter Mui – fashion designer, actor, and musician
 I.M. Pei – world-renowned late architect
 Mary Ping – fashion designer
 Shen Wei – choreographer, stage designer
 Mimi So – jewelry designer
 Phillipa Soo – Broadway actress
 Peter Som – fashion designer 
 Anna Sui – fashion designer
 Brandon Sun – fashion designer
 Vivienne Tam – fashion designer
 Oscar and Hsin Mei Agnes Hsu Tang – philanthropists to the Metropolitan Museum of Art on the Upper East Side of Manhattan
 Zang Toi – fashion designer
 Alexander Wang – fashion designer
 Dorothy Wang – actress, Bling Empire: New York
 Vera Wang – fashion designer
 Yuja Wang – concert pianist
 Jason Wu – fashion designer
 Ximan Li – filmmaker
 Xin Ying – modern dancer
 Sophia Yan – classical pianist
 Bowen Yang – writer and actor, Saturday Night Live
 Yeohlee Teng – fashion designer
 Yuhua Hamasaki – drag queen
 Joe Zee – fashion stylist

See also

 Asian Americans in New York City
 Bangladeshis in New York City
 Chinese Americans
 Demographics of New York City
 Filipinos in the New York metropolitan area
 Fuzhounese in New York City
 Indians in the New York City metropolitan region
 Japanese in New York City
 Koreans in New York City
 Russians in New York City
 Taiwanese people in New York City

References

Sources

 Lee, Josephine Tsui Yueh. New York City's Chinese Community. Arcadia Publishing, 2007. , .

Ethnic groups in New York City